Eublemma scitulum, the grey eublemma, is a moth of the family Erebidae. The species was first described by Rambur in 1833. It is widespread in Africa and Asia.

Distribution
Algeria, Chad, the Democratic Republic of the Congo, Egypt, Gambia, Ghana, Kenya, Lesotho, Libya, Malawi, Mauritania, Morocco, Mozambique, Namibia, Nigeria, Somalia, South Africa, Sudan, Tunisia, Zambia, Zimbabwe, India, Pakistan, Sri Lanka, New Guinea, Australia and France,

Biology
The caterpillar is bright pink to reddish. Its prolegs are modified to a pair of large suckers for adhering to the substrate. Body is covered with a light silken web, which serves as a shield. Pupation occurs within this shield.

Caterpillars of the genus Eublemma are pests on several scale insects. The E. scitula caterpillar is a pest on Kerria, Anomalococcus, Lecanium, Ceroplastes, Pulvinaria species, Drepanococcus cajani, Saissetia coffeae, Saissetia oleae, Ceraplastes rusci, Didesmococcus unifasciatus, Cerococcus indicus and Coccidohystrix insolita.

References

External links
Action predatrice d' eublemma scitula [Lepidoptera Noctuidae, Erastriinae] dans le Sud de la France
Biology of Eublemma scitula Ramb. (Lepidoptera: Noctuidae), a predator of brown scale, Saissetia coffeae Wlk. (Homoptera: Coccidae) infesting pointed gourd, Trichosanthes dioica Roxb.
Predation of Eublemma scitula (Lepidoptera: Noctuidae, Erastriinae) in the South of France [on Saissetia oleae, Ceraplastes rusci, Didesmococcus unifasciatus]
Predatory and Parasitic Lepidoptera: Carnivores Living On Plants

Moths of Asia
Moths described in 1833
Boletobiinae